The Men's high jump event at the 2013 European Athletics Indoor Championships was held at March 1, 2013 at 16:30 & 18:30 (qualification) and March 2, 16:15 (final) local time.

Records

Results

Qualification
Qualification: Qualification Performance 2.31 (Q) or at least 8 best performers advanced to the final.

Final
The final was held at 16:15.

References

High jump at the European Athletics Indoor Championships
2013 European Athletics Indoor Championships